Nebria kumgangi is a species of ground beetle in the Nebriinae family that is endemic to North Korea.

References

kumgangi
Beetles described in 1983
Beetles of Asia
Endemic fauna of North Korea